Kästner (transliterated Kaestner) is a German surname. Notable people with the surname include:

 Abraham Gotthelf Kästner, (1719-1800), German mathematician
 Kästner (crater), a lunar crater
 Detlef Kästner (born 1958), German boxer
 Erich Kästner (1899–1974), German author
 (12318) Kästner asteroid named after Erich Kästner
 Erich Kästner (camera designer) (1911–2005), German movie camera designer
 Erich Kästner (World War I veteran) (1900–2008), the last known German veteran of the First World War
 Mercedes Kaestner-Varnado (born 1992), American professional wrestler known as Sasha Banks
 Peter Kaestner (born 1953), American foreign service officer and ornithologist

Other 

 Louis Kaestner, fictional character in the period political crime drama Boardwalk Empire, one of the main protagonists in the first season and one of the two main antagonists in the second season

See also
 Kastner
 Kestner

German-language surnames